Vestnytt ("West News") is a local newspaper published in Straume, Norway, and covers the municipalities of Fjell, Sund and Øygarden.

History and profile
Vestnytt was established in 1988. The paper is owned by Bergens Tidende. It is a bilingual newspaper and published in both Nynorsk and Bokmål. 

It was formerly published three days a week, on Tuesdays, Thursday, and Saturdays, but since 2015 appears twice a week, on Tuesdays and Fridays. Its editorial office is in Straume, the municipal center of Fjell. The paper's first editor was Geir Magnus Nyborg, followed by Øyvind Risnes. The paper is currently edited by Marit Kalgraf, who succeeded Elisabeth Netland after 18 years.

Circulation
According to the Norwegian Audit Bureau of Circulations and National Association of Local Newspapers, Vestnytt has had the following annual circulation:
 2006: 6,022
 2007: 6,143
 2008: 6,176
 2009: 6,162
 2010: 6,069
 2011: 6,053
 2012: 5,948
 2013: 5,914
 2014: 5,718
 2015: 5,276
 2016: 4,876

References

External links
Vestnytt homepage

Newspapers published in Norway
Norwegian-language newspapers
Sund, Norway
Fjell
Øygarden
Mass media in Møre og Romsdal
Publications established in 1988
1988 establishments in Norway
Bilingual newspapers